Tre’ Lamb (born September 16, 1989) is an American football coach and former player who is currently the head coach at Gardner–Webb University. He previously served as an assistant coach at Tennessee Tech and Mercer. Lamb played a role in the turnaround of a struggling Tennessee Tech football program.  Tre Lamb and his wife, Carter Lamb, are celebrating the recent birth of his daughter, Olivia Lamb.

Playing career
Lamb was a three-year starting quarterback for Tennessee Tech. In 2011, he led the Golden Eagles to their first Ohio Valley Conference championship victory in 36 years. That same year, he helped the Golden Eagles break 9 program records including points scored in a season (355), highest scoring average in a season (32.3 points per game), and most first downs in a season (238). He was the recipient of the Robert Hill Johnson Award. He graduated from Tennessee Tech with a Bachelor's Degree in Interdisciplinary Studies.

Coaching career

Tennessee Tech
In 2013, Lamb was hired as the quarterbacks coach at Tennessee Tech.

Mercer
In 2014, Lamb was hired as the quarterbacks coach at Mercer. Lamb's focus while at Mercer was on player development. He helped the Bears' quarterbacks set a new program record for passing yards. He coached Mercer quarterback, John Russ, and played an instrumental part in his recognition on the CFPA FCS Offensive Player of the Year Watch List.

Tennessee Tech (second stint)
In 2018, Lamb was hired as the offensive coordinator at Tennessee Tech. During his stint at Tennessee Tech, he engineered a remarkable turnaround in the program's offense. In 2017 and 2018 combined, the Golden Eagles won just 2 games. During the 2019 season, with Lamb's assistance, the Golden Eagles improved their overall record to 6–6. In 2019, the Golden Eagles accumulated 348 total scoring points which was 58% greater than other scoring offenses in the Ohio Valley Conference.

Gardner–Webb
On December 14, 2019, Lamb was named the head coach at Gardner–Webb University, replacing Carroll McCray. Going into his first season at Gardner-Webb, his recruiting class is ranked third in the Big South Conference. Included in this class are four three-star recruits.

Head coaching record

References

External links
 Gardner–Webb profile

1989 births
Living people
American football quarterbacks
Gardner–Webb Runnin' Bulldogs football coaches
Mercer Bears football coaches
Tennessee Tech Golden Eagles football coaches
Tennessee Tech Golden Eagles football players
People from Calhoun, Georgia
Coaches of American football from Georgia (U.S. state)
Players of American football from Georgia (U.S. state)